The Hannover Club or Hanover Club was a political society in the Kingdom of Great Britain active during the early 18th century. They were committed to the succession of King George of Hanover to the British throne, rather than the rival claimant James III known as the 'Old Pretender'. It was made up of supporters of the Whig faction.

Less well known than the more celebrated Kit Kat Club, with whom they shared many beliefs and members, the group was arguably more important and powerful in pushing for the Hanoverian Succession and proved invaluable to George following the death of Queen Anne in 1714, and the year of turmoil that followed. 

Future Whig Prime Minister the Duke of Newcastle was a member of the club.

References

Bibliography
 Browning, Reed. The Duke of Newcastle. Yale University Press, 1975.
 Field, Ophelia. The Kit-Cat Club: Friends who Imagined a Nation. Harper Collins, 2008.

Political organisations based in the United Kingdom
Politics of the Kingdom of Great Britain